Aisin Gioro Hongchun (弘春; 11 October 1703 – 3 March 1739) was a Qing dynasty imperial prince; the eldest son of Yunti, the Kangxi Emperor's 14th son by Empress Xiaogongren, and Qianlong Emperor's cousin. Hongchun was granted a title of Prince Tai of the Second Rank in 1731 and held it until 1735, when he was stripped of his privileges together with future descendants. Unlike other imperial princes whose lineages became extinct, Hongchun's lineage survived till the end of the Qing dynasty. As Prince Tai of the Second Rank peerage was not granted perpetual inheritability, each successive bearer would hold diminished ranks vis-a-vis his predecessor.

Life of Hongchun 
Hongchun was born on 11 October 1703 to lady Šušu Gioro, Yunti's secondary consort. In his childhood, Hongchun was described as a filial and intelligent child, which resulted in a close relationship with father.

In 1723, Hongchun was granted a title of the prince of the fourth rank, but was later stripped of his title after it was discovered that Yunti had been a member of "The Party of Eighth Lord" (八爷党) which unsuccessfully supported Yunsi's ascension to the imperial throne. As a result, Yunsi was banished from the imperial clan and renamed "Akina" (阿其那, meaning "frozen fish"). Yunti was placed under the house arrest in the Hall of Imperial Longevity (寿皇殿) in the Jingshan Park in 1726.  Hongchun took care of his father during the confinement, which aided his career by bestowal of the title of grace defender duke on him.

In 1728, Hongchun was promoted to the prince of the third rank. In 1731, he was granted the title Prince Tai of the Second Rank (泰郡王, meaning "peaceful"). Prior to ascension of the Qianlong Emperor, Hongchun was blamed for misusing the annual stipend, especially embezzlement of 1000 taels. Moreover, Yongzheng Emperor accused him of blasphemy against Buddha. Hongchun was stripped of his title and his property was arrested by Embroidered Uniform Guards, Qing dynasty secret police known as "luanyiwei" (銮仪卫) at that time. Hongchun died on 3 March 1739 and did not receive posthumous honours.

His descendants became minor clansmen (闲散宗室, pinyin: xiansan zongshi), hence being recorded in imperial genealogy.

Family of Hongchun 
Hongchun was married to lady Guwalgiya, daughter of viscount Qingde (庆德). His secondary consort, lady Usun, was demoted to mistress shortly after he was stripped of his princely title.
Consorts and issue:

 Primary consort, of the Gūwalgiya clan (嫡妻 瓜尔佳氏)  
 Yongxin (永信, 1720–1806), first son
 Chang'anbao (常安保, 1721–1727), second son
 Yongyu (永豫, 1723–1781), third son
 Yongshuo (永朔, 1724–1773), fifth son
 Mistress, of the Usun clan (妾 乌苏氏) 
 Yongta (永塔; 1735–1749), seventh son
 Mistress, of the Wang clan (妾 王氏)
 Leader of imperial guards Yongjin (头等侍卫永晋;1729–1775), sixth son
 Mistress, of the Cui clan (妾崔氏)
 Changqingbao (常庆保；1723–1729), fourth son

Members of Prince Tai of the Second Rank peerage 

 Hongchun (1703–1739)
 Yongxin (永信, 1720–1806), first son
 Mianshun (绵顺,1743–1748), Yongxin's son who died prematurely
 Yizhang (奕彰,1768–1836), Miandai's second son by lady Feimo adopted as a posthumous successor of Mianshun
 Zaifen (载芬 1821–1867), Yizhang's son
 Puyong (溥雍, 1843–1883), Zaifen's son
 Yuduan (毓鍴, 1887-?), Puyong's adoptive son and Pugang's biological son
 Hengji (恒纪, 1907-?), Yuduan's son
 Yongjin (永晋), Hongchun's  sixth son
 Miandai (绵代), Yongjin's eldest son
 Yihou (奕厚,1773–1856), Miandai's first son
 Yizhang, adopted as Mianshun's son
 Yiduan (奕短), died prematurely
Mianbing (绵炳,1764-1790), Yongjin's son
 Yiju (奕炬,1788-1845), Mianbing's son
Zaidou (载豆,1831-1891), Yiju's son
Pugang (溥岗,1855-?), Zaidou's son 
Yuduan, adopted by Puyong
 Mianbei (绵備), Yongjin's son
 Yishan (1790–1878), Mianbei's eldest son, held the title of a first class zhenguo jiangjun from 1847 to 1878
 Zaizhuo (载鷟), Yishan's second son, held the title of a third class fuguo jiangjun from 1851 to 1876
 Puhan (溥翰), Zaizhuo's eldest son, held the title of a third class fengguo jiangjun from 1857 to 1878, held the title of a third class fuguo jiangjun from 1878 to 1886
 Yuzhao (毓照), Puhan's third son, held the title of a third class fuguo jiangjun from 1887

References 

Qing dynasty imperial princes
1703 births
1739 deaths
Prince Tai